Brokeback may refer to:
"Brokeback Mountain" (short story), a 1997 short story by Annie Proulx
Brokeback Mountain, a 2005 film based on the 1997 short story

Brokeback (band), a band/solo artist